Alexandre Rodrigues da Silva (born 11 December 1980) is a Brazilian handball player who competed in the 2008 Summer Olympics.

References

External links
 

1980 births
Living people
Brazilian male handball players
Olympic handball players of Brazil
Handball players at the 2008 Summer Olympics
21st-century Brazilian people